Alberto Mazzucato (28 July 1813 – 31 December 1877) was an Italian composer, music teacher, and writer.

Mazzucato was born in Udine.  Trained at the Padua Conservatory, he composed eight operas between 1834 and 1843, of which his most successful was Esmeralda (1838). He also contributed music to the pastiche La vergine di Kermo (1870) which also contained music by Carlo Pedrotti, Antonio Cagnoni, Federico Ricci, Amilcare Ponchielli, and Giovanni Pacini. Along with Luigi Felice Rossi and Guglielmo Quarenghi, he formed the Società di S Cecilia in 1860.

After his last opera, Hernani, premiered at the Teatro Carlo Felice in Genoa on 26 December 1843, Mazzucato retired from his work as a composer in order to focus on his career as an educator. He had been appointed to the staff of the Milan Conservatory in 1843, eventually becoming its Director in 1872. Among his notable pupils were composers Arrigo Boito, Benedetto Junck, Isidore de Lara, Antônio Carlos Gomes, and Ivan Zajc, sopranos Marcella Lotti della Santa and Marietta Gazzaniga, and tenor Sims Reeves. As a writer, he wrote articles for the Gazzetta musicale di Milano between 1845 and 1858. In 1859 he was appointed to the post of maestro direttore e concertatore at La Scala, a position he held until 1868. He died nine years later in Milan at the age of 64.

Alberto Mazzucato married Teresa Bolza, daughter of Count , Austrian police commissioner in Milan. Their daughter Eliza Mazzucato Young (1846-1937) was a composer, pianist, and music educator in the United States. Their son Giannandrea Mazzucato (1850-1900) was a music writer, librettist, and critic based in London.

Operas

La fidanzata di Lammermoor (1834)
Don Chisciotte (1836)
Esmeralda (1838)
Coro dei penitenti (1838)
I corsari (1840)
I due sergenti (1841)
Luigi V, re di Francia (1843)
Hernani (1843)
La vergine di Kermo (1870)

References

1813 births
1877 deaths
Italian classical composers
Italian male classical composers
Academic staff of Milan Conservatory
Italian opera composers
Male opera composers
People from Udine
19th-century classical composers
19th-century Italian composers
19th-century Italian male musicians